Lippia palmeri is a species of flowering plant in the verbena family, Verbenaceae.  It is native to the Sonoran Desert.

It is a tall slender shrub, reaching 2 metres in height and spreading to 1 metre.  Fragrant white flowers can be found on the plant after the  rains.

Uses
The Seri call the shrub xomcahiift and use the leaves as a culinary herb.  Medicinally Seri use an infusion of the leaves applied topically to kill head lice.

References

palmeri
Flora of Mexico